Vapor intrusion (VI) is a process by which chemicals in soil or groundwater - especially Volatile Organic Compounds (VOCs) - migrate to indoor air above a contaminated site.

Definition
The United States Environmental Protection Agency defines vapor intrusion as "a migration of volatile chemicals from groundwater contamination or contaminated soil into an overlying building". The chemicals can be of different classes including volatile organic compounds (VOCs), certain semi-volatile organic compounds (SVOCs) and inorganic chemicals, such as elemental mercury, polycyclic aromatic hydrocarbons (PAHs), naturally occurring radon, and hydrogen sulfide.

Concerns
At worst, vapor intrusion can be a safety hazard, e.g., when flammables are involved in form of an explosion.
Noxious vapors can cause health effects, either acutely such as CNS disturbances like headaches or mental status changes, and they can have chronic health effects, e.g. in the case of radon, which can cause lung cancer.
Lastly, vapors can be severe "aesthetic problems", e.g., odors from hydrogen sulfide.

Guidance

In the United States, vapor intrusion is handled in individual states in different ways.

Pathbreaking guidance on vapor intrusion was released by the New York Department of Health in 2006.

In June 2010, the American Society for Testing and Materials (ASTM International) released a commercial "Standard Guide for Vapor Encroachment Screening on Property Involved in Real Estate Transactions" (ASTM E 2600–10).

In 2002 the US EPA had issued its first draft guidance on the subject . The George W. Bush Administration dropped the project in 2003, and only in 2013 Obama's appointee as EPA Assistant Administrator in the Office of Solid Waste and Emergency Response, made it a priority to complete the document. On June 11, 2015, the EPA released its final Vapor Intrusion Technical Guide, along with a Technical Guide for Addressing Petroleum Vapor Intrusion At Leaking Underground Storage Tank Sites. A guide is neither a statute nor a regulation, but a guidance.

See also 
Superfund for a list of Environmental Protection Agency Superfund sites
Trichloroethylene (TCE) for a discussion of the chemical compound
 Vapor Intrusion (DTSC)

References

Airborne pollutants
Air pollution